Ryan Henk Donk (born 30 March 1986) is a professional footballer who plays as a centre-back for Süper Lig club Kasımpaşa. Born in the Netherlands, he represents the Suriname national team.

Club career

RKC and AZ
Donk impressed in the 2005–06 season at RKC Waalwijk and with an expiring contract, he wanted to make a step up to a higher level. AZ first approached him, but other clubs including Ajax, PSV and Barcelona showed serious interest in him. Donk chose to go to AZ as a replacement for Joris Mathijsen who had been sold to German club Hamburger SV, thinking it to be the best for his development. Initially, AZ intended to loan Donk to Waalwijk, but he stated his intent to stay at the club in an attempt to push into the first team. He earned himself a place in the starting lineup and impressed with his performances.

Loan to West Brom
On 31 August 2008, Donk signed for West Bromwich Albion for one year on loan. He made his debut in a 1–0 win away at Middlesbrough on 28 September 2008.

Club Brugge
On 26 June 2009, Donk moved from AZ in his home country of the Netherlands, to Belgium to play for Club Brugge.

Kasımpaşa
At the start of the 2013–14 season, Donk transferred to Turkish side Kasımpaşa for an undisclosed fee. He played as a central defender for the team in his first two years, however during the first half of the 2015–16 season before transferring to Galatasaray, he played mainly as defensive midfielder.

Galatasaray
On 5 January 2016, Galatasaray announced that they had signed Donk. On 9 January 2016, Donk made his debut for Galatasaray and scored his first goal in penalty box against Karşıyaka in the 2015–16 Turkish Cup. He also made an assist for his teammate Bilal Kısa in same match.

On 31 August 2016, after being rarely used by Galatasaray during his first season at the club, Donk joined La Liga club Real Betis in a season-long loan deal, with a buyout clause.

Return to Kasımpaşa
In August 2021 Donk joined fellow Turkish club Kasımpaşa on a one year deal, with an option for a further year.

International career
In 2007 Donk was called up by Jong Oranje coach Foppe de Haan to be part of his squad for the 2007 UEFA European Under-21 Football Championship held in the Netherlands. Donk participated in both of their first round group matches against Israel (1–0 win) and Portugal (2–1 win) to secure a semi final spot and to qualify for the 2008 Summer Olympics. During the tournament his sister was involved in a car accident. Donk left the Dutch squad for a day and returned into the tournament after it was known her health was improving. After the Dutch qualified for the semi final and Olympics Donk took off his football jersey to reveal another shirt having the text "Dit toernooi is voor jou, ik hou van je." (This tournament is dedicated to you, I love you.) on it to support his sister. In the semi finals against England (1–1, 13–12 after 32 penalty kicks) Donk assisted Maceo Rigters to score his 90th-minute equaliser with a bicycle kick which took the game into extra time. Donk was the only Dutch player on the field at the end of the game not to shoot a penalty after one England player (Nedum Onuoha) was unable to shoot due to an injury while England had no substitutes left. The Dutch went on to retain their 2006 title by beating Serbia 4–1 in the final. After his display at the tournament, Donk made the pre-selection of the Dutch national team on 6 August.

Born in the Netherlands and of Surinamese descent, Donk was called up for a friendly match with the Suriname national football team in 2014, but was not given permission to join the squad.

In 2015, Donk expressed an interest in representing the Turkey national football team, being eligible through residence in the country. He has not received a formal callup to the team.

In November 2019, Donk got an official call up by Dean Gorré to represent Suriname. He made his debut, as a team captain, on 24 March 2021 in a World Cup qualifier against the Cayman Islands and scored the second goal in a 3–0 victory. In June 2021 Donk was named to the 23-man Suriname squad for the 2021 CONCACAF Gold Cup.

Style of play
A tall and commanding defender, Donk has drawn comparisons to many former footballers – one being former Dutch defender Jaap Stam.

Career statistics

Club

International

Scores and results list Suriname's goal tally first, score column indicates score after each Donk goal.

Honours 
Galatasaray
 Süper Lig: 2017–18, 2018–19
 Turkish Cup: 2015–16, 2018–19
 Süper Kupa: 2016, 2019

References

External links

Ryan Donk player profile at wba.co.uk
 
 
 

1986 births
Living people
Footballers from Amsterdam
Surinamese footballers
Suriname international footballers
Dutch footballers
Netherlands under-21 international footballers
Dutch sportspeople of Surinamese descent
Association football midfielders
Association football defenders
A.V.V. Zeeburgia players
RKC Waalwijk players
AZ Alkmaar players
West Bromwich Albion F.C. players
Club Brugge KV players
Kasımpaşa S.K. footballers
Galatasaray S.K. footballers
Real Betis players
Eredivisie players
Premier League players
Belgian Pro League players
Süper Lig players
La Liga players
2021 CONCACAF Gold Cup players
Surinamese expatriate footballers
Dutch expatriate footballers
Expatriate footballers in England
Expatriate footballers in Belgium
Expatriate footballers in Turkey
Expatriate footballers in Spain
Surinamese expatriate sportspeople in England
Surinamese expatriate sportspeople in Belgium
Surinamese expatriate sportspeople in Turkey
Surinamese expatriate sportspeople in Spain
Dutch expatriate sportspeople in England
Dutch expatriate sportspeople in Belgium
Dutch expatriate sportspeople in Turkey
Dutch expatriate sportspeople in Spain